Jacob F. Gmelich (July 23, 1839 – February 21, 1914) was an American politician. He served as the State Treasurer of Missouri from 1905 to 1909. and the 27th Lieutenant Governor of Missouri from 1909 to 1913 serving under Governor Herbert S. Hadley.

References

State treasurers of Missouri
Lieutenant Governors of Missouri
Missouri Republicans
1839 births
1914 deaths
19th-century American politicians